Enterr10 Bangla is an Indian Bengali-language general entertainment channel launched in 2019. The channel broadcasts Bengali movies and dubbed series from its sister channel Dangal along with few original Bengali shows. The owner of the channel is Enterr10 Television Company. The channel is available for the audiences as free-to-air.

Current programming
Mohua Ek Nari Shoktir Kahini (2022-present)
Devi Adi Parashakti (2022-present)
Mann Sundar (2022-present)
Jai Jai Shani Dev (2021–present)
Rokshabandhan (2023-present)
Crime Alert (2019–present)

Former programming
Alif Laila
Rokter Shombondo
Shivarjun Ek Ichadhari Naaginer Golpokotha
Maharaj Sri Krishna
Ek Paloke Ektu Dekha
Chandragupta Maurya: Ek Oitihasik Golpokotha
Baba Bor Ene De
Jyoti: Sonar Jiboner Anondo
Bondini
Swapno Songi 
Abar Phire Elo Naagin

Original programming 
Sagar Jyoti
Roja

References

External links

Bengali-language television channels in India
Television channels and stations established in 2019
Television stations in Kolkata
Movie channels in India
2019 establishments in West Bengal